Waterworks Road is an  arterial road in Brisbane, Queensland, Australia. It is currently signed as State Route 31 for its entire length. Waterworks Road transports traffic between the Brisbane central business district and western suburbs such as Red Hill, Ashgrove and The Gap.

History
Waterworks Road was built on a Turrbal pathway that led to Mount Coot-tha – a place of the honey-bee Dreaming.

It was surveyed and named in 1864 as a direct route to the site of the Enoggera Dam, which was built from 1864 to 1866.

A small Catholic Church was built on Waterworks Road in 1921, and St Finbarr’s Catholic primary school in 1925. The tram line was extended from Red Hill to Jubilee Terrace in 1924, and then to Coopers Camp Road in 1935. This line operated continuously until it was closed in 1969. Examples of 1920s and later trams are shown.

Route
Connecting to the terminus of Musgrave Road (which leads into the city), Waterworks Road begins as a four-lane road in Red Hill. The road then leads into the central section of Ashgrove and intersects with major roads such as Jubilee Terrace and Stewart Road. Once the road reaches West Ashgrove, it is divided into two roads; the inbound road being Glory Street. After intersecting Coopers Camp Road, Waterworks Road forms back into a single, four-lane road and continues into The Gap. Once in The Gap, Waterworks Road intersects with Settlement Road, which connects traffic from The Gap to Keperra. Following this major intersection, Waterworks Road becomes a two-lane road and terminates at The Gap Park 'n' Ride. It connects to Mount Nebo Road, which travels to rural suburbs Mount Nebo and Mount Glorious.

In most sections of the road, there is a T2 Lane which operates between 7-9am on weekdays.

Terrain
From Musgrave Road, Waterworks Road descends the north-western slope of Red Hill until it crosses Ithaca Creek. It then climbs to the ridge line between Ithaca Creek and Enoggera Creek, and continues west to the Coopers Camp Road intersection. From there it descends rapidly into the Enoggera Creek valley and proceeds west into the gap between the Taylor Range to the north and Mount Coot-tha to the south. After crossing Enoggera Creek at Walton Bridge it follows the ridge line between Enoggera Creek and Fish Creek to its transition to Mt Nebo Road.

Upgrade
In 2018, it was proposed that Waterworks Road required an upgrade between Trout Street and Beth Eden Terrace in Ashgrove to improve traffic efficiency, reduce congestion and improve safety of road users. The upgrade includes the addition of a secondary right-turn lane on the Waterworks Road - Stewart Road intersection, the addition of a left-turn lane on the Waterworks Road - Ashgrove Avenue intersection and the relocation of Bus stop 16 on Waterworks Road. Construction began in April 2019.

Local heritage places
The Brisbane City Council has defined a number of local heritage places in Waterworks Road under the Queensland Heritage Act 1992. They are:
 Stewart Place (including war memorial and tram shelter)
 Residences at 150 and 180 Waterworks Road
 Churches at 202 and 290 Waterworks Road
 Ashgrove Private Hospital (former)
 Montvue Buildings
 Ithaca Bridge
 Two tram shelters (example shown)

Major intersections
The entire road is in the Brisbane local government area.

See also
 Waterworks (an article about water supply)

References

External links
 Waterworks Road, The Gap 1940s.

Red Hill, Queensland
Roads in Brisbane
Ashgrove, Queensland
The Gap, Queensland